Dicentra (Greek dís "twice", kéntron "spur"), known as bleeding-hearts, is a genus of eight species of herbaceous plants with oddly shaped flowers and finely divided leaves, native to eastern Asia and North America.

Description
Flowers have two tiny sepals and four petals. The flowers are bisymmetric: the two outer petals are spurred or pouched at the base and curved outwards or backwards at the tip, and the two inner ones with or without a crest at the tip. In Dicentra, all leaves are in a basal rosette, and flowers are on leafless stalks. In other genera with bisymmetric heart-shaped flowers (Lamprocapnos, Dactylicapnos, Ichtyoselmis, Ehrendorferia), leaves grow on stems as well as from the root. Each of the two compound stamens is composed of one median and two lateral half stamens fused together. The stamens and pistil are held between the inner petals. Native to Northeastern Asia's chilly, wet forests, bleeding heart flowers grow in dappled shade, whereas if grown in poorly drained soil and intense shadows they will not bloom or survive.

Seeds with elaiosomes are borne in long capsules.

All parts are poisonous if ingested.

Taxonomy

Current species
The genus Dicentra includes plants whose flowers and leaves grow on stems directly from the roots. Species with branching stems used to be included in the genus, but have now been moved to other genera.

Former species
The genera Dactylicapnos, Ichtyoselmis, Ehrendorferia and Lamprocapnos were previously included as subgenera in Dicentra, but have been shown not to belong in this genus (see for example Flora of China)

 Dactylicapnos Wall. (14 species of herbaceous climbers with yellow flowers, Himalaya to SW China)
 Dactylicapnos burmanica (K.R.Stern) Lidén
 Dactylicapnos grandifoliolata Merrill (Dicentra paucinervia K.R.Stern)
 Dactylicapnos lichiangensis (Fedde) Hand.-Mazz.
 Dactylicapnos macrocapnos (Prain) Hutchinson
 Dactylicapnos roylei (Hook.f.  &  Th.) Hutchinson
 Dactylicapnos scandens (D.Don) Hutchinson
 Dactylicapnos schneideri (Fedde) Lidén  
 Dactylicapnos gaoligongshanensis Lidén
 Dactylicapnos torulosa (Hook.f. & Th.) Hutchinson (Dicentra wolfdietheri Fedde)
 Dactylicapnos cordata Lidén
Ehrendorferia Lidén (2 species of erect robust herbaceous perennials with yellow or cream erect flowers, Western N America)
 Ehrendorferia ochroleuca (Engelm.) Lidén=Dicentra ochroleuca  Engelm.
 Ehrendorferia chrysantha (Hook. & Arn.) Lidén. Golden Ear-drops=Dicentra chrysantha Hook. & Arn.
Ichtyoselmis Lidén (1 species of large herbaceous perennial with serrate leaflets and large drooping cream flowers, China, Burma)
 Ichtyoselmis macrantha (Oliver) Lidén
Lamprocapnos Endlicher (1 species of herbaceous perennial with large pink flowers in horizontal racemes, NE China, Korea)
 Lamprocapnos spectabilis (L.) Fukuhara bleeding heart=Dicentra spectabilis Lem.

Cultivation

There are several hybrids and cultivars involving Dicentra eximia, Dicentra formosa, and Dicentra peregrina, including (those marked   have gained the Royal Horticultural Society's Award of Garden Merit):-

Dicentra 'Aurora' — Dicentra formosa × Dicentra eximia — white flowers
D. formosa 'Bacchanal'  — deep red
Dicentra 'Ivory Hearts' — Dicentra peregrina × Dicentra eximia 'Alba' — white
Dicentra 'King of Hearts' — Dicentra peregrina × (Dicentra formosa subsp. oregana × Dicentra eximia)
D. formosa 'Langtrees' 
Dicentra 'Luxuriant'  — Dicentra formosa × Dicentra eximia × Dicentra peregrina

Dicentra 'Stuart Boothman'

Hybrids involving Dicentra peregrina are often intolerant of hot, humid climates and sun, like the species itself.

References

 
Papaveraceae genera